Waracha (Aymara for wooden camp bed, Hispanicized spelling Huaracha) is a  mountain in the Apolobamba mountain range in Bolivia. It is situated in the La Paz Department, Franz Tamayo Province, Pelechuco Municipality. Waracha lies east of the mountain Jach'a Waracha and north-east of Qala Phusa.

References 

Mountains of La Paz Department (Bolivia)